Lazor may refer to:
Theodosius (Lazor) (secular name Frank Lazor; born 1933), retired primate of the Orthodox Church in America
Bill Lazor (born 1972), American football coach and former player
Johnny Lazor (1912–2002), American Major League Baseball player
Sascha Lazor, member of the Mad Caddies, an American ska punk band founded 1995

See also

 Laser, a device that emits light through a process of optical amplification based on the stimulated emission of electromagnetic radiation